This is a list of prime ministers of Barbados.

Premiers of Barbados (1953–1966)

Queen Elizabeth II in right of the United Kingdom (1953–66)

Prime Ministers of Barbados (1966–Present)

Queen Elizabeth II in right of Barbados (1966–2021)

President Sandra Mason (2021-present)

See also

 Ilaro Court
 Elections in Barbados
 Politics of Barbados
 Prime Minister of the West Indies Federation
 Governor-General of Barbados
 List of Commonwealth of Nations prime ministers
 List of current members of the British Privy Council

Notes

 Died in office.

External links
 Barbados Elections
 Leaders of Barbados
 Rulers of Barbados - From settlement to present
 Flag of the Prime Minister of Barbados

Barbados
List
Barbados
Prime Ministers